Un Jin Moon (born 1967) is a Korean American equestrian and a daughter of Unification Church founder Sun Myung Moon. She was chosen by the Korean Athletic Committee to participate in the equestrian competition of the Asian Games.

Moon's first marriage to Jun Heon Park was arranged by her parents and resulted in two children. She left the marriage and moved to Virginia. She sought custody of her children. Moon's interest in horses led her father to build her a $10 million riding facility. In 1998, she remarried, to Rodney Jenkins, Hall of Fame Grand Prix Show Jumper and one of the greatest hunter jumper riders in history who, in retirement, is a successful thoroughbred racehorse trainer in Maryland.

References

Living people
1967 births
American female equestrians
American people of Korean descent
21st-century American women